My Extreme Animal Phobia is an Animal Planet television miniseries that premiered on October 21, 2011.  Each episode of the series focuses upon three patients who are assisted by Dr. Robin Zasio in overcoming their various animal phobias through exposure therapy over the course of five days.

Episodes

Season 1: 2011–2011
Season 1 premiered on October 21, 2011 and runs during the Friday night 10 p.m. timeslot on Animal Planet.

Critical reception
My Extreme Animal Phobia received mixed reviews. Neil Genzlinger of The New York Times was quite critical of the show, calling it "fairly ridiculous" and "a disservice, really, to those afflicted with debilitating phobias."

References

External links

Animal Planet original programming
2011 American television series debuts